Matteo Fedi (born 11 November 1988 in Pistoia) is an Italian former road cyclist. His brother Andrea also competed as a professional cyclist.

Major results
2006
 1st Trofeo Città di Ivrea
 8th Overall Giro della Toscana Juniors
2008
 4th GP Industrie del Marmo
 6th GP Città di Felino
2013
 8th Overall Troféu Joaquim Agostinho

References

External links

1988 births
Living people
Italian male cyclists
People from Pistoia
Sportspeople from the Province of Pistoia
Cyclists from Tuscany